Tamsin Heatley is a British actress. She has appeared on television programmes such as The Bill, The Young Ones, Horrid Henry, Fimbles, Tweenies, Big & Small and various other children's television shows. Her father was Norman Heatley, a biochemist who helped pioneer early penicillin research.

Films and TV
2002 - Fimbles

References

External links

Living people
English television actresses
Year of birth missing (living people)